"Brown Rang" is a Punjabi-language song sung, produced and written by Yo Yo Honey Singh. The record was released on 11 November 2011. Upon release, the song topped the charts worldwide and captured positive reviews both from critics and the audience. The music video was released on 28 February 2012. It was a big hit, and became YouTube's most trending video of 2012. It won the top spot in the list of YouTube's most watched videos of 2012 in India with over 10 million views.
According to YouTube Rewind, the song had beaten the popular K-pop song by PSY, "Gangnam Style" that stood at second place in the list.

Awards

 MTV VMAI award for Brown Rang

References

Sahil Sharma

2011 songs